Gwen Pharis Ringwood (13 August 1910 Anatone, Washington – 24 May 1984 Williams Lake, British Columbia) was a Canadian playwright.

Life
She graduated from the University of Alberta. She worked part-time as a secretary for Elizabeth Sterling Haynes, and then working at the Banff Centre for the Arts as registrar.  She studied playwriting at University of North Carolina.

The theatre in Williams Lake, and an award for drama, given by the Writers' Guild of Alberta, are named for her.

Her papers are held at University of Calgary.

Awards
 1939 Dominion Drama Festival
 1941 Governor General's Awards

Books

 Younger Brother, Longmans, Green, 1959
 The Collected Plays of Gwen Pharis Ringwood. Ed: Enid Delgatty Rutland. Ottawa: Borealis Press, 1982. 
 The Gwen Pharis Ringwood Papers, Marlys Chevrefils, Shirley A. Onn, and Apollonia Steele, editors, February 1988,

Plays
 The Dragons of Kent, Banff School of Fine Arts, Alberta, 1935
 Chris Axelson, Blacksmith, University of North Carolina, 1938
 One Man's House, University of North Carolina, 1938
 Still Stands the House, Playmakers Theatre in Chapel Hill, North Carolina, 1938
 Pasque Flower, University of North Carolina, 1939
 The Days May Be Long, Unproduced, 1940
 Red Flag at Evening, University of Alberta Extension Department, Edmonton, 1940
 Saturday Night, University of Alberta Extension Department, Edmonton, 1940
 The Courting of Marie Jenvrin, Banff School of Fine Arts, Alberta, 1941
 Christmas 1943, University Women's Club, Edmonton, 1943
 The Rainmaker, 1944
 The Jack and the Joker, Banff School of Fine Arts, Alberta 1944
 Dark Harvest, University of Manitoba Dramatic Society, Winnipeg, 1945
 Stampede, Alberta Folklore and Local History Project, 1945
 Hatfield, the Rainmaker Banff School of Fine Arts, Alberta 1945
 Drowning at Wasyl Nemitchuck, The (A Fine Coloured Easter Egg), Banff School of Fine Arts, Alberta 1946
 Oh Canada, My Country, Edmonton, (1948 – 1951?)
 Widger's Way, University of Alberta, 1952
 Lament for Harmonica (Maya) Ottawa Little Theatre 1959
 Look Behind You, Neighbour, City of Edson, Alberta, 1961
 Lion and the Mouse, Cariboo Indian School, Williams Lake, B.C, 1964
 The Sleeping Beauty, Cariboo Indian School, Williams Lake, 1965
 The Three Wishes, Williams Lake School, 1965
 The Road Runs North, Williams Lake Junior High School, Williams Lake, 1967
 Encounters, Gwen Ringwood Theatre, Williams Lake, 1970
 The Deep Has Many Voices, Gwen Ringwood Theatre, Williams Lake, 1971
 The Stranger, Gwen Ringwood Theatre, Williams Lake, 1971
 The Golden Goose, Cariboo Indian School, Williams Lake 1973
 A Remembrance of Miracles, Gwen Ringwood Theatre, Williams Lake, 1975
 Lament for harmonica (1975)
 The Lodge, West Vancouver Little Theatre 1976
 Ludmilla's Odyssey
 The Magic Carpets of Antonio Angelini, St. Boniface Theatre Company, Winnipeg 1976
 Mirage, University of Saskatchewan, 1979

References

External links
"Gwen Pharis Ringwood", doollee
"GERALDINE ANTHONY, "Gwen Pharis Ringwood." Boston, Twayne Publishers, 1981.", Theater Research in Canada, Anton Wagner, 2005
 Gwendolyn Ringwood entry in The Canadian Encyclopedia

University of Alberta alumni
1910 births
1984 deaths
Canadian women dramatists and playwrights
University of North Carolina at Chapel Hill alumni
Writers from Alberta
20th-century Canadian dramatists and playwrights
20th-century Canadian women writers
American emigrants to Canada